Chroomonas elegans is a species of cryptophytes. The type locality is Lake Neusiedl, at the Austria-Hungarian border.

References 

 Chroomonas elegans at AlgaeBase.org (retrieved 21 July 2016)

Cryptomonads
Species described in 1957
Biota of Austria
Biota of Hungary